The 1989 Northeast Louisiana Indians football team was an American football team that represented Northeast Louisiana University (now known as the University of Louisiana at Monroe) as part of the Southland Conference during the 1989 NCAA Division I-AA football season. In their first year under head coach Dave Roberts, the team compiled a 4–6–1 record.

Schedule

References

Northeast Louisiana
Louisiana–Monroe Warhawks football seasons
Northeast Louisiana Indians football